Colour of My Soul is the second studio album released by Full Flava, which is the brainchild of a group of two writers and musicians based in Birmingham - Rob Derbyshire and Paul 'Solomon' Mullings, assisted by back-up vocalist Tee. Their debut album Chinese Whispers featured as an upfront item on the Blues & Soul Hip List chart.

Rob Derbyshire is an experienced touring musician, having worked as keyboard player with legendary former Motown artist Edwin Starr, while the other group member and producer Paul 'Solomon' Mullings worked with reggae bands in the Midlands and was a guitarist in Pato Banton's band.

The line up of guest artists who were invited to participate the Full Flava's albums was a remarkable. As concerns their second studio project, it included in total eight female vocalists coming from both sides of the Atlantic: Carleen Anderson, Romina Johnson, Donna Odain, Beverlei Brown, Hazel Fernandes, Alison Limerick, CeCe Peniston, and Donna Gardier. Among those three singers contributed with two solo tracks Anderson, Limerick and Peniston.

Four singles were issued from the set. "Stories" by Anderson, Johnson's track "Round & Round" and Fernandes' song "Nature Boy" on a double A-sided single, "For My Baby" by Peniston, and "Make It Right" by Donna Odain.

The Ruf N Tumble Remix of "For My Baby" (one the compositions performed by CeCe Peniston on the album Colour of My Soul) was based on a sample of "Heartache No. 9", the Delegation hit single, which scored at number fifty-seven in US Dance and number sixty-six on US R&B chart in 1980.

Track listing

Credits and personnel
 Carleen Anderson - lead vocal
 Romina Johnson - lead vocal
 Donna Odain - lead vocal, back vocal, writer
 Beverlei Brown - lead vocal, back vocal

 Hazel Fernandes - lead vocal, back vocal
 Alison Limerick - lead vocal, back vocal, writer
 CeCe Peniston - lead vocal, back vocal, writer
 Donna Gardier - lead vocal
 Tee - back vocal
 Rob Derbyshire - writer
 Paul 'Solomon' Mullings - writer
 Ika - writer, back vocal
 Bing Abrahams - writer, back vocal
 Eden Ahbez - writer
 Suzanna Woods - Singer/Songwriter 
 Antonia Finch - violin, viola

 Beverley Ridout - flute
 Alvin Davis - trumpet, saxophone
 Alvin Ewen - bass
 Colin Peters - bass
 Roger Williams - design
 Chris Judge - cover illustration
 Denis Blackham - mastering
 EMI Music Publishing/Minaret Music - publisher
 Perfect Songs - publisher
 Copyright Control - publisher
 Warner Chappell Music- publisher
 CeCe Music (ASCAP) - publisher

References 

General

Specific

External links 
 
 
 
 
 
 
 
 

2003 albums
CeCe Peniston albums